The 2017 Iraq FA Cup Final was the 26th final of the Iraq FA Cup as a clubs-only competition. The match was contested between Al-Zawraa and Naft Al-Wasat, at Al-Sinaa Stadium in Baghdad. It was played on 22 August 2017 to be the final match of the competition.

Al-Zawraa made their record 17th appearance in the Iraq FA Cup final while Naft Al-Wasat, based in Najaf, became the first ever team from outside Baghdad to reach the final. Al-Zawraa won the match 1–0 with a stoppage time goal from Alaa Abdul-Zahra, for the club's record 15th title.

The winners of the cup, Al-Zawraa, qualified for the 2018 AFC Cup as well as the 2017 Iraqi Super Cup, which they won by beating league champions Al-Quwa Al-Jawiya.

Route to the Final

Note: In all results below, the score of the finalist is given first (H: home; A: away).

Match

Details

References

External links
 Iraq Football Association

Football competitions in Iraq
2016–17 in Iraqi football
Iraq FA Cup
August 2017 sports events in Iraq